The Collins Spanish Dictionary is a bilingual dictionary of English and Spanish derived from the Collins Word Web, an analytical linguistics database.  As well as its primary function as a bilingual dictionary, it also contains usage guides for English and Spanish (known as Lengua y Uso and Language in Use respectively) and English and Spanish verb tables. In 2009,  the dictionary was brought to the iPhone & iPad platform. The iOS app of this dictionary, which has become one of the most popular Spanish dictionaries in the App store since then is developed by Cole Zhu Inc.

External links
iOS App  iPhone & iPad version of the Complete & Unabridged 9th Edition.
CollinsDictionary.com – Internet front-end to Collins Unabridged Spanish Dictionary content.

See also 
 Collins-Robert French Dictionary

Translation dictionaries
William Collins, Sons books
1971 non-fiction books
Spanish dictionaries
Online English dictionaries